ORP Orzeł (291) is a Polish Navy 'Project 877E' submarine.  She is the third Polish submarine to bear the name Orzeł (Eagle).

The boat was built by the Shipyard Krasnoe Sormovo in Gorky and was commissioned on 29 April 1986 at Riga. On 13 June of the same year Orzeł was transferred to Gdynia where she was named on 21 June. The submarine was assigned to the 3rd Flotilla based in Gdynia. It is currently the oldest Kilo-class submarine in active service.

References 

Kilo-class submarines of the Polish Navy
Attack submarines
Ships built in the Soviet Union
1986 ships
Submarines of Poland
Poland–Soviet Union relations
Ships built by Krasnoye Sormovo Factory No. 112